Jairo Pérez Suárez (born March 24, 1973 in Iza, Boyacá) is a male professional track and road cyclist from Colombia. He won a silver medal for his native country at the 2007 Pan American Games in Rio de Janeiro, Brazil alongside Carlos Alzate, Arles Castro and Juan Pablo Forero in the Men's Track Team Pursuit. He competed at the 2008 Summer Olympics in Beijing, PR China.

Career

1998
1st in Stage 1 Vuelta a Colombia, Circuito del Llano (COL)
1st in Stage 7 Vuelta a Colombia, Alto de Santa Helena (COL)
1999
1st in Stage 10 Vuelta a Colombia, Barrancabermeja (COL)
1st in Stage 2 Clásico RCN, Tocancipá (COL)
2000
1st in Stage 11 Vuelta al Táchira, Bramón (VEN)
1st in Stage 9 Vuelta a Colombia, Manizales (COL)
1st in Stage 14 Vuelta a Colombia, Villa de Leyva (COL)
2001
1st in Stage 6 Clásico RCN, Villa de Leyva (COL)
1st in Stage 6 Vuelta a Venezuela, Calabozo circuit (VEN)
3rd in General Classification Vuelta a Venezuela (VEN)
1st in General Classification Doble Copacabana GP Fides (BOL)
1st in Stage 2 Doble Copacabana GP Fides, Viacha (BOL)
2002
1st in Stage 6 Vuelta a Colombia, Bogota (COL)
2003
1st in Tuta (COL)
3rd in  National Championships, Track, Pursuit, Colombia, Duitama (COL)
2004
1st in Stage 3 Vuelta al Tolima, Coello (COL)
1st in Stage 1 Vuelta a Antioquia, Jardin (COL)
1st in Stage 3 Vuelta a Antioquia, Sabaneta (COL)
1st in Stage 6 part a Doble Copacabana GP Fides, San Pedro De Tiquina (BOL)
1st in Prologue Vuelta a Costa Rica, Velódromo Nacional del Parque de La Paz (CRC)
1st in Stage 2 Vuelta a Costa Rica, Circuito Interdistrital en San Carlos (CRC)
1st in Stage 4 Vuelta a Costa Rica, Playas del Coco (CRC)
2005
1st in Tuta (COL)
3rd in  National Championships, Track, Points Race, Colombia (COL)
1st in Stage 1 Clasica del Meta (COL)
2nd in General Classification Clasica del Meta (COL)
2006
2nd in Tuta (COL)
1st in Stage 4 Vuelta al Valle del Cauca (COL)
1st in Stage 8 part b Vuelta a la Independencia Nacional, Santo Domingo (DOM)
1st in General Classification Vuelta a la Independencia Nacional (DOM)
2007
  in Pan American Championships, Track, Team Pursuit, Valencia (VEN)
alongside Juan Pablo Forero, Arles Castro, and Carlos Alzate
  in Pan American Games, Track, Team Pursuit, Rio de Janeiro (BRA)
alongside Juan Pablo Forero, Arles Castro, and Carlos Alzate
1st in Stage 5 Vuelta a Colombia, La Vega (COL)
2008
1st in Stage 4 Vuelta al Tolima, Ibagué (COL)
1st in Stage 6 International Cycling Classic, Bensenville (USA)
1st in Stage 17 International Cycling Classic, Whitefish Bay (USA)

References

External links
 
 
 
 

1973 births
Living people
Colombian male cyclists
Colombian track cyclists
Olympic cyclists of Colombia
Cyclists at the 2008 Summer Olympics
Pan American Games medalists in cycling
Pan American Games silver medalists for Colombia
Cyclists at the 2007 Pan American Games
Medalists at the 2007 Pan American Games
Central American and Caribbean Games medalists in cycling
Central American and Caribbean Games gold medalists for Colombia
Central American and Caribbean Games silver medalists for Colombia
Competitors at the 1998 Central American and Caribbean Games
Competitors at the 2006 Central American and Caribbean Games
Vuelta a Colombia stage winners
Vuelta a Venezuela stage winners
Sportspeople from Boyacá Department
20th-century Colombian people
21st-century Colombian people